Triboliini is a tribe of darkling beetles in the family Tenebrionidae. There are about 10 genera in Triboliini.

Genera
These genera belong to the tribe Triboliini:
 Aesymnus Champion, 1886  (the Neotropics)
 Hypogena Dejean, 1834  (North America and the Neotropics)
 Latheticus C.O. Waterhouse, 1880  (North America, the Palearctic, Indomalaya, and Oceania)
 Lyphia Mulsant & Rey, 1859  (North America, tropical Africa, Indomalaya, Australasia, and Oceania)
 Metulosonia Bates, 1873  (the Neotropics)
 Mycotrogus Horn, 1870  (North America and the Neotropics)
 Platybolium Blair, 1938  (Indomalaya)
 Spelaebiosis Bousquet & Bouchard, 2018  (the Neotropics)
 Tribolium W.S. MacLeay, 1825 (flour beetles)  (worldwide)
 Xenogloeus Wollaston, 1861  (tropical Africa)

References

Further reading

 
 

Tenebrioninae